Thea Sofie Loch Næss (born 26 November 1996, Kristiansand) is a Norwegian actress.

Biography
She started acting at the age of 8. She played a leading role in  Eirik Svensson’s coming-of-age film 'One Night in Oslo' in 2013, which premiered in April 2014. In 2014 Næss was studying drama at the Hartvig Nissens school in Oslo. She played the role of Thea in Dryads in 2015. She played the role of the king's daughter Christina of Norway in The Last King which premiered in 2016. In 2016 she was cast in a pilot for a new HBO series (Mogadishu, Minnesota) that ultimately wasn't picked up. In 2018 she took the role of villain Skade in the third series of The Last Kingdom on Netflix, and played Bergliot in Episode Six of Saving the Human Race on CW Seed.

Filmography

References

External links 
 

1996 births
Living people
People from Kristiansand
Actresses from Oslo
Norwegian film actresses
Pages with unreviewed translations